Rubí or Rubi may refer to:

Television 
, on Maha Cartoon TV
Rubí (1968 TV series), a 1968 Mexican telenovela
Rubí (2004 TV series), a 2004 Mexican remake of the original 1968 telenovela
Rubi (Philippine TV series), a 2010 Philippine television remake
Rubí (American TV series), a 2020 American television remake
Rubí rebelde, a Venezuelan telenovela, based on a novel by Inés Rodena

Places 
 Font-rubí, Spanish municipality in the comarca of the province of Barcelona
 Rubí, Barcelona, Spanish municipality of the province of Barcelona
 Rubí de Bracamonte, Spanish municipality of the province of Valladolid
 Rubi River, left tributary of the Itimbiri River, Democratic Republic of the Congo
 Rubi Valley Rural Municipality, Nepalese rural municipality

People 
 Adorable Rubí (1931–2012), Mexican Luchador
 Fred Rubi (1926–1997), Swiss alpine skier
 Mel Rubi, American artist
 Rubí Cerioni (1927–2012), Argentine footballer
 Rubi Dalma (1906–1994), Italian actress
 Rubi (footballer) (born 1970), Spanish footballer and manager
 Rubi Noor (1945–2008), Indian politician
 Rubi Rose (born 1998), American rapper and model
 Rubí Rodríguez, Chilean mathematician
 Rubí Soto (born 1995), Mexican professional footballer
 Vicente Rubi (1903–1980), Filipino Visayan musician

Other uses
 Rubi character, in the writing systems of East Asia
 Rubi (plural), members of the plant genus Rubus (brambles); not to be confused with Rubia (madders)
 Callophrys rubi, the green hairstreak butterfly

See also 
 Ruby (disambiguation)